Ali Smith CBE FRSL (born 24 August 1962) is a Scottish author, playwright, academic and journalist. Sebastian Barry described her in 2016 as "Scotland's Nobel laureate-in-waiting".

Early life and education
Smith was born in Inverness on 24 August 1962 to Ann and Donald Smith. Her parents were working-class and she was raised in a council house in Inverness. From 1967 to 1974 she attended St. Joseph's RC Primary school, then went on to Inverness High School, leaving in 1980.

She studied a joint degree in English language and literature at the University of Aberdeen from 1980 to 1985, coming first in her class in 1982 and gaining a top first in Senior Honours English in 1984. She won the University's Bobby Aitken Memorial Prize for Poetry in 1984.

From 1985 to 1990 she attended Newnham College, Cambridge, studying for a PhD in American and Irish modernism. During her time at Cambridge, she began writing plays and as a result did not complete her doctorate.

Smith moved to Edinburgh from Cambridge in 1990 and worked as a lecturer in Scottish, English and American literature at the University of Strathclyde. She left the university in 1992 because she was suffering from chronic fatigue syndrome. She returned to Cambridge to recuperate.

As a young woman, Smith held several part-time jobs including a waitress, lettuce-cleaner, tourist board assistant, receptionist at BBC Highland and advertising copywriter.

Career
While studying for her PhD at Cambridge, Smith wrote several plays which were staged at the Edinburgh Festival Fringe and Cambridge Footlights. After some time working in Scotland, she returned to Cambridge to concentrate on her writing, in particular, focussing on short stories and freelancing as the fiction reviewer for The Scotsman newspaper. In 1995 she published her first book, Free Love and Other Stories, a collection of 12 short stories which won the Saltire First Book of the Year award and Scottish Arts Council Book Award.

She writes articles for The Guardian, The Scotsman, New Statesman and the Times Literary Supplement.

In 2009, she donated the short story Last (previously published in the Manchester Review online) to Oxfam's 'Ox-Tales' project, four collections of UK stories written by 38 authors. Her story was published in the 'Fire' collection.

Works

Novels
Like (1997)
Hotel World (2001)
The Accidental (2005)
Girl Meets Boy (2007)
There But For The (2011)
Artful (2012)
 How to Be Both (2014)
 Autumn (2016)
 Winter (2017)
 Spring (2019)
 Summer (2020)
 Companion Piece (2022)

Short story collections
Free Love and Other Stories (1995), awarded the Saltire First Book of the Year award and Scottish Arts Council Book Award.
Other Stories and Other Stories (1999)
The Whole Story and Other Stories (2003)
The First Person and Other Stories (2008)
Public Library and Other Stories (2015)

Plays
Stalemate (1986), unpublished, produced at the Edinburgh Festival Fringe
The Dance (1988), unpublished, produced at the Edinburgh Festival Fringe
Trace of Arc (1989), produced at the Edinburgh Festival Fringe
Daughters of England (1989-1990), unpublished, Cambridge Footlights
Amazons (1990), Cambridge Footlights
Comic (1990), unpublished, produced at the Edinburgh Festival Fringe
The Seer (2001)
Just (2005)

Non-fiction
Shire (2013), with images by Sarah Wood: short stories and autobiographical writing. Full Circle Editions.

Other projects

Ali Smith partnered with the Scottish band Trashcan Sinatras and wrote the lyrics to a song called "Half An Apple", a love song about keeping half an apple spare for a loved one who is gone. The song was released on 5 March 2007, on the album Ballads of the Book.
In 2008, Smith produced The Book Lover a collection of her favourite writing including pieces from Sylvia Plath, Muriel Spark, Grace Paley, and Margaret Atwood. It also includes work from writers like Joseph Roth and Clarice Lispector.
In 2008, Smith contributed the short story "Writ" to an anthology supporting Save the Children. The anthology is entitled The Children's Hours and was published by Arcadia Books. Foreign editions have been published in Portugal, Italy, China and Korea.
In 2011 she wrote a short memoir for The Observer in their "Once upon a life" series: "Looking back on her life, writer Ali Smith returns to the moment of conception to weave a poignant and funny memoir of an irreverent father, a weakness for Greek musicals and a fateful border crossing."
In October 2011, Smith published The Story of Antigone, a retelling of the classic created by Sophocles. It is part of the "Save the stories" series by Pushkin Children’s Books and is illustrated by Laura Paoletti.
In October 2012, Smith read a sermon at Manchester Cathedral to guests and students, followed by a book signing.
In 2013, Smith published Artful, a book based on her lectures on European comparative literature delivered the previous year at St Anne's College, Oxford. Artful was well-received, with one reviewer commenting that, "...her new book, in which she tugs at God’s sleeve, ruminates on clowns, shoplifts used books, dabbles in Greek and palavers with the dead, is a stunner."
On 14 May 2013, Smith gave the  National Centre for Writing's inaugural Harriet Martineau lecture, in celebration of Norwich, UNESCO's 2012 City of Literature.
 Smith is also a patron of the Visual Verse online anthology and her piece "Untitled", written in response to an image by artist Rupert Jessop, appears in the November 2014 edition.
On 10 September 2015, Smith was nominated Honorary Fellow by Goldsmiths, University of London.
In 2011, she contributed the short story "Scots Pine (A Valediction Forbidding Mourning)" to Why Willows Weep, an anthology supporting The Woodland Trust. The paperback edition was released in 2016.
In July 2016, Smith was awarded an honorary doctorate from the University of East Anglia.
 Smith is a patron of Refugee Tales. In 2016, Smith's story "The Detainee's Tale" was published by Comma Press in Refugee Tales Volume 1.
 In May 2021, Smith contributed a short story entitled "The final frontier" to a newborn magazine, The European Review of Books.

Personal life 
Smith lives in Cambridge with her partner, filmmaker Sarah Wood.

Awards and honours 
In 2007, Smith was elected a Fellow of the Royal Society of Literature She was appointed Commander of the Order of the British Empire (CBE) in the 2015 New Year Honours for services to literature.

An honorary doctorate (D.Litt) was awarded to her by Newcastle University in 2019.

Literary awards

References

1962 births
Living people
20th-century British journalists
20th-century British short story writers
20th-century Scottish dramatists and playwrights
20th-century Scottish novelists
20th-century Scottish women writers
21st-century British journalists
21st-century British short story writers
21st-century LGBT people
21st-century Scottish dramatists and playwrights
21st-century Scottish women writers
21st-century Scottish writers
Academics of the University of Strathclyde
Alumni of Newnham College, Cambridge
Alumni of the University of Aberdeen
British bisexual writers
British women journalists
British women short story writers
Commanders of the Order of the British Empire
Fellows of the Royal Society of Literature
Goldsmiths Prize winners
People educated at Inverness High School
People from Cambridge
People from Inverness
People with chronic fatigue syndrome
Scottish journalists
Scottish LGBT novelists
Scottish scholars and academics
Scottish short story writers
Scottish women academics
Scottish women dramatists and playwrights
Scottish women novelists
Scottish academics of English literature